A pusher aircraft is a type of aircraft using propellers placed behind the engines.
Pushers may be classified according to lifting surfaces layout (conventional or 3 surface, canard, joined wing, tailless and rotorcraft) as well as engine/propeller location and drive. For historical interest, pusher aircraft are also classified by date.
Some aircraft have a Push-pull configuration with both tractor and pusher engines. The list includes these even if the pusher engine is just added to a conventional layout (engines inside the wings or above the wing for example).

Conventional and three surface layouts
The conventional layout of an aircraft has wings ahead of the empennage.

Direct drive

Propeller ahead of tail

Between frames (Farman layout)

 

 

 

 

 

 
Voisin-Farman I 1907, 60 built
AEA June Bug 1908 experimental, 1 built
Cody British Army Aeroplane No 1 1908, 1 built
AEA Silver Dart 1909, first flight in Canada, 1 built
Curtiss No. 1 1909 Golden Flyer biplane, 1 built
Curtiss No. 2 1909 Reims racer biplane, 1 built
Cody Michelin Cup Biplane 1910, 1 built
Bristol Boxkite 1910 trainer, 78 built
Howard Wright 1910 Biplane 1910, 7 built
Royal Aircraft Factory F.E.1 1910 biplane, 1 built
Wright Model B 1910 biplane 2 seater, about 100 built
Cody Circuit of Britain biplane 1911, 1 built
Curtiss Model D 1911 biplane, 1 seat
Curtiss Model E 1911 biplane floatplane, 17+ built
Baldwin Red Devil 1911 aerobatic biplane, 6 built
Farman MF.7 1911 biplane, unk no. built
Cody V biplane 1912, 2 built
Cody VI biplane/floatplane 1913, 1 built
Short S.38 1912, 48 built
Farman HF.20 1913 military biplane, unk no. built
Farman MF.11 1913 biplane, unk no. built
Grahame-White Type X Charabanc 1913 transport, 1 built
Short S.80 Nile Pusher Biplane Seaplane 1913, 1 built
Grahame-White Type XV 1913 trainer, 135 built
Sopwith Bat Boat 1913, 6 built

Between frames or booms (1915 and later)
Breguet Bre.4 1914 2 seat military biplane, about 100 built
Grahame-White Type XI 1914 reconnaissance biplane, 1 built
Short S.81 1914, 1 built
Sopwith Gunbus 1914, 35 built (including floatplanes)
Vickers F.B.5 1914, 224 built
Voisin III 1914 bomber, about 3200 built 
Wight Pusher Seaplane 1914, 11 built
Breguet Bre.5 1915 2 seat military biplane, unk no. built
AD Scout 1915 interceptor, 4 built
AGO C.II 1915 reconnaissance biplane, 15 built
Airco DH.1 1915 biplane, 2 seat, 100 built, 
Airco DH.2 1915 biplane fighter, 453 built
Avro 508 1915, 1 built
Farman F.30 1915 military biplane, unk no. built
Farman F.40 1915 military biplane, unk no. built
Otto C.I 1915 reconnaissance biplane, unk no. built
Pemberton-Billing P.B.25 1915 scout, 20 built
Royal Aircraft Factory F.E.2 1915 military biplane, 1939 built
Royal Aircraft Factory F.E.8 1915 biplane fighter, 295 built
Voisin IV 
Voisin V 1915 bomber, about 350 built
Breguet Bre.12 1916 2 seat military biplane, unk no. built
Friedrichshafen FF.34 1916 patrol seaplane, 1 built
Häfeli DH-1 1916 reconnaissance biplane, 6 built
Vickers F.B.12 1916 fighter, about 22 built
Voisin VII 1916 reconnaissance biplane, about 100 built
Voisin VIII 1916 bomber, about 1,100 built
Blackburn Triplane 1917 fighter, 1 built
Curtiss Autoplane 1917 (hops only) roadable aircraft, 1 built
Port Victoria P.V.4 1917 floatplane, 1 built.
Royal Aircraft Factory F.E.9 1917 2 seat fighter, 3 built
Royal Aircraft Factory N.E.1 1917 night fighter, 6 built
Savoia-Pomilio SP.3 1917 reconnaissance biplane about 350 built
Vickers F.B.26 Vampire 1917, 4 built
Voisin IX 1917 reconnaissance biplane, 1 built
Voisin X 1917 bomber, about 900 built
Vickers VIM 1920, 35 built

Between booms
Henderson H.S.F.1 1929 transport, 1 built
Hanriot H.110 1933 fighter, 1 built
Stearman-Hammond Y-1 1934 safety airplane about 20 built
de Schelde Scheldemusch 1935 1 seat biplane trainer, 6 built
ITS-8 1936 motorglider monoplane, 2 built
SCAL FB.30 Avion Bassou 1936 2 seat light aircraft, 2 built
Abrams P-1 Explorer 1937, 1 built
SAIMAN LB.2 1937 2 seat monoplane, 1 built
Alliet-Larivière Allar 4, 1938 experimental 2 seat, 1 built 
General Aircraft GAL.33 Cagnet 1939 trainer, 1 built
WNF Wn 16 1939, Austrian experimental aircraft
General Aircraft GAL.47 1940 observation, 1 built
de Schelde S.21 1940 fighter mockup (unflown)
Fane F.1/40 1941 observation monoplane, 1 built
Saab 21 1943 fighter, 298 built
Vultee XP-54 1943 fighter, 2 built
Skoda-Kauba V6 1944 1 seat, 1 built

1945 and later
Convair 106 Skycoach 1946 4 seater, one built
Fokker F.25 1946 4 seater, 20 built
SECAN Courlis 1946 transport, unk no. built
Anderson Greenwood AG-14 1947 2 seat experimental, 6 built  
Heston JC.6/AOP 1947 2 seat reconnaissance, 2 built
Alaparma Baldo 1949 1 seat, about 35 built
SNCASO SO.8000 Narval 1949 naval fighter, 2 built
Anderson Greenwood AG-14 1950 2 seats, 6 built
SIAI-Marchetti FN.333 Riviera 1952 amphibie 4 seater, 29 built
Potez 75 1953 reconnaissance, 1 built
SIAI-Marchetti FN.333 Riviera 1962 4 seat amphibian, 29 built
Akaflieg Stuttgart FS-26 Moseppl 1970 1 seat powered sailplane, unk no. built
Cessna XMC 1971 research aircraft, 1 built
Akaflieg Stuttgart FS-28 Avispa 1972 2 seat transport, 1 built
Kortenbach & Rauh Kora 1973 Motor glider, 2 built
Lartin Skylark 1973 Utility Prototype
PZL M-17 1973 Trainer Prototype
Edgley Optica 1979 ducted fan observation aircraft 21 built

1980 and later
ADI Condor 1981 2 seat motorglider, unk no. built
Acapella 200 1982 homebuilt, 1 built 
Applebay Zia 1982 1 seat ultralight motorglider, 4 built
Sadler Vampire 1982 Ultralight
Spectrum SA-550 1983 Utility prototype, 2 built
RTAF-5 1984 Trainer prototype
Aero Dynamics Sparrow Hawk Mk.II 1984 Experimental 2 seater 
NPO Molniya 1993 transport 6 seater, 2 built 
Yakovlev Yak-58 1993 Utility, 7 built
HFL Stratos 300 1996 1 seat ultralight motorglider
NPP Aerorik Dingo 1997 multi-role amphibian (air cushion), 6 built
Toucan PJ-1B 1998 experimental 1 seat, one built
Creative Flight Aerocat 2001 Transport Prototype
Airsport Song 2009 ultralight
Northrop Grumman Firebird 2010 Reconnaissance Prototype
Ion Aircraft Ion 2007 prototype 2 seater tandem, 1 built
Terrafugia Transition 2009 roadable airplane 2 seater, 2 built
WLT Sparrow 2010 Ultralight, 13 built 
Synergy Aircraft Synergy 2011 Double boxtail demonstrator electric powered 1/4 scale model, in development
AHRLAC Holdings Ahrlac 2014 reconnaissance attack, 1 built
Commuter Craft Innovator 2016 prototype 2 seater, 1 built 
ISA 180 Seeker 2019 prototype monoplane

Between booms / UAV's
IAI Scout 1977 UAV drone
AAI RQ-2 Pioneer1986 UAV drone
EADS Harfang 2008 UAV drone

Between outboard tail booms
Blohm & Voss P208 1944 fighter project 
Skoda-Kauba SK SL6 1944 research one seat project

Coaxially in rear fuselage
Royal Aircraft Factory F.E.3/A.E.1 1913 armoured biplane, 1 built
Royal Aircraft Factory F.E.6, 1914, 1 built
Gallaudet D-4 1918 seaplane, 2 built
Vickers Type 161 1931 fighter prototype (with structural frame), 1 built
Austria Krähe 1960 1 seat motorglider, unk no. built
Brditschka HB-3 1971 2 seat motorglider, unk no. built
Rhein Flugzeugbau RW 3 Multoplan 1955 27 built
Rhein Flugzeugbau Sirius I 1969, 2 seats
RFB/Grumman American Fanliner 1973, 2 seats, 2 built
RFB Fantrainer 1977, 2 seats, 47 built
Buselec 2, 2010 project, with electric motor

Nacelle above fuselage
WW1 or Before
Curtiss Model F 1912 flying boat, 150+ built
Benoist XIV 1913 transport flying boat, 2 built
FBA Type A, B, C 1913 patrol flying boat, unk no. built
Lohner E 1913, about 40 built
Donnet-Denhaut flying boat 1915 patrol flying boat, about 1,085 built 
FBA Type H 1915 patrol flying boat, ~2000 built
Grigorovich M-5 1915 patrol flying boat, about 300 built
Lohner L, R and S 1915, 100+ built
AD Flying Boat, Supermarine Channel & Sea Eagle 1916 patrol and airline flying boat, 27 built. 
Grigorovich M-9 1916 patrol flying boat, about 500 built
Grigorovich M-11 1916 fighter flying boat, about 60 built
Hansa-Brandenburg CC 1916 flying boat fighter, 73 built
Macchi L.2 1916, reconnaissance flying boat, 17 built
Macchi M.3 1916, reconnaissance flying boat, 200 built
Norman Thompson N.T.4 1916 patrol flying boat, 72 built
Oeffag-Mickl G 1916 trimotor patrol flying boat, 12 built
Curtiss HS 1917 patrol flying boat, about 1,178 built
Grigorovich M-15 1917 patrol flying boat, unk no. built
Macchi M.5 1917, flying boat fighter, 244 built
Norman Thompson N.T.2B 1917 flying boat trainer, 100+ built
Tellier T.3 and Tc.6 1917 patrol flying boat, about 155 built
Hansa-Brandenburg W.20 1918 U-boat flying boat, 3 built
Macchi M.7 1918 flying boat fighter, 100+ built
Macchi M.9 1918 flying boat bomber, 30 built
Macchi M.12 1918 flying boat bomber, about 10 built
Royal Aircraft Factory C.E.1 1918 flying boat, 2 built
SIAI S.9 1918 flying boat, unk no. built
SIAI S.12 1918 flying boat, 1 built
Sperry Land and Sea Triplane 1918 patrol flying boat, 2 built
Supermarine Baby 1918 flying boat fighter, 1 built

1920s
Aeromarine 40 1919 flying boat trainer, 50 built
Aeromarine 50 1919 transport flying boat, unk no. built
Boeing B-1 1919 transport flying boat, 1 built
SIAI S.13 1919 reconnaissance flying boat, unk no. built
SIAI S.16 1919 flying boat, 100+ built
Supermarine Sea Lion I & II 1919 racing flying boats, 2 built 
Vickers Viking, Vulture and Vanellus 1919 amphibious flying boats, 34 built.
Vought VE-10 Batboat 1919 navy flying boat, 1 built
Macchi M.18 1920 flying boat, 90+ built
Supermarine Commercial Amphibian 1920, 1 built
Supermarine Scarab 1923, 12 built
Supermarine Seal 1921, 4+ built
Supermarine Seagull 1921, 34 built
CAMS 30 1922 flying boat trainer, 31 built
CAMS 31 1922 flying boat fighter, 2 built
Fokker B.I & III 1922 biplane reconnaissance flying boat, 2 built
SIAI S.51 1922 racing flying boat, 1 built
CAMS 38 1923 racing flying boat, 1 built
FBA 17 1923 flying boat trainer, 300+ built
Savoia-Marchetti S.57 1923 reconnaissance flying boat, 20 built
Supermarine Sea Eagle 1923, 3 built
Canadian Vickers Vedette 1924 forestry patrol flying boat, 60 built
CANT 7 1924 flying boat trainer, 34 built
Ikarus ŠM 1924 flying boat trainer, 42 built
Macchi M.26 1924 flying boat fighter, 2 built 
CANT 10 1925 flying boat airliner, 18 built
Rohrbach Ro VII Robbe 1925 flying boat, 3 built
Savoia-Marchetti S.59 1925 reconnaissance flying boat, 240+ built
CAMS 37 1926 reconnaissance flying boat, 332 built
CAMS 46 1926 flying boat trainer, unk. no built
CANT 18 1926 flying boat trainer, 29 built
Savoia-Marchetti S.62 1926 reconnaissance flying boat, 175+ built
CANT 25 1927 flying boat fighter, unk no. built
Canadian Vickers Vista 1927 1 seat monoplane flying boat, 1 built
Boeing Model 204 Thunderbird 1929 flying boat, 7 built
Macchi M.41 1927 flying boat fighter, 42 built
Supermarine Sheldrake 1927, 1 built
Fokker F.11/B.IV 1928 monoplane transport flying boat, 7 built 
Rohrbach Ro X Romar 1928 flying boat, 3 built
Savoia-Marchetti S.64 1928 distance record monoplane, 2 built

1930s
FBA 310 1930 amphibious flying boat transport, 9 built
SIAI S.67 1930 flying boat fighter, 3 built
FBA 290 1931, amphibious flying boat trainer, 10 built
Fizir AF-2 1931 amphibious flying boat trainer, 1 built 
Amiot 110-S 1931 patrol flying boat, 2 built
Loening XSL 1931 submarine airplane, 1 built
Beriev MBR-2 1931 flying boat, 1365 built
Savoia-Marchetti S.66 1931 airliner flying boat, 24 built
Tupolev MDR-2 1931 flying boat, 1 built
Aichi AB-4 1932 flying boat, 6 built
Boeing-Canada A-213 Totem 1932 flying boat, 1 built
Dornier Do 12 1932 amphibian, 4 seats, 1 built
Savoia-Marchetti SM.78 1932 patrol flying boat, 49 built
General Aviation PJ 1933 monoplane flying boat, 5 built
Loire 50 1933 training amphibian, 7 built
Savoia-Marchetti SM.80bis 1933 transport amphibian, 1+ built
Supermarine Seagull/Walrus 1933 military flying boat, 740 built
Aichi E10A 1934 reconnaissance flying boat, 15 built
Loire 130 1934 reconnaissance flying boat, 125 built
Beriev MBR-2 1935 flying boat, 1365 built
Curtiss-Wright CA-1 1935 amphibious flying boat, 3 built
Dornier Do 18 1935 monoplane flying boat, 170 built
Aichi E11A 1937 reconnaissance flying boat, 17 built
Kawanishi E11K 1937 monoplane flying boat, 2 built
SNCAO 30 1938 flying boat trainer, 2 built
Nikol A-2 1939 amphibious flying boat trainer, 1 built

Post War II
SCAN 20 1945 flying boat trainer, 24 built
Volmer VJ-21 Jaybird 1947 2 seat light aircraft, unk no. built 
Volmer VJ-22 Sportsman 1958 2 seat homebuilt amphibian, (not all are pushers), 100+ built
Lake Buccaneer 1959 amphibian, 4 seats, 1000+ built
Aerosport Woody Pusher 1967 tandem 2 seater, parasol wing, 27 ex.
Taylor Coot 1969 2 seat homebuilt amphibian, 70 built
Aerosport Rail 1970 single seat ultralight, twin engine, 1 built
Osprey Osprey 2 1973 2 seat homebuilt, unk no. built
3I Sky Arrow (now marketed by Magnaghi Aeronautica) 1982 maiden flight, ULM/LSA/GA tandem two-seater high wing, some 50 built
RFB X-114 1977 ground-effect craft prototype 6/7 seat, 1 built
Freedom Master FM-2 flying boat homebuilt prototype 2 seat, 1 built
3I Sky Arrow (Magnaghi Aeronautica) 1982, ULM/LSA/GA 2 seater tandem, about 50 built
Tisserand Hydroplum and SMAN Pétrel 1983 homebuilt amphibian, about 63 built
Microleve Corsario 1988 ultralight amphibious homebuilt, unk no. built
Creative Flight Aerocat 2001 amphibious 4 seater prototype, 1 built 
Airmax Sea Max 2005 2 seat biplane amphibian, unk no. built
CZAW Mermaid 2005 2 seat amphibious biplane, unk no. built

Below tail boom
Nelson Dragonfly 1947 motorglider, 7 built
AmEagle American Eaglet 1975 ultralight motorglider, 12 built
Jean St-Germain Raz-Mut 1976 1 seat ultralight, 7 built
Alpaero Sirius 1984 1 seat UL motorglider, 20 built
Taylor Tandem, unk no. built

Between up and down tail booms
Raab Krähe 1958 motorglider 1 seat, 30 built
Brditschka HB-3, HB-21, HB-23 1971- 1982 motorgliders 2 seater
HB-204 TornadoHB Flugtechnik 2013 prototype 2 seater

Above tailboom
Loening Model 23 Air Yacht 1921 transport flying boat, 16 built
Koolhoven F.K.30 Toerist 1927 2 seat monoplane, 1 built
Curtiss-Wright Junior 1930 2 seat ultralight, 270 built
Curtiss-Wright CW-3 Duckling 1931 ultralight amphibious flying boat, 3 built
British Aircraft Company Drone 1932 1 seat ultralight, 33 built
Siebel Si 201 1938 reconnaissance 2 built
Republic RC-3 Seabee 1945 4 seat amphibian, 1,060 built
Fokker F.25 Promotor 1946 transport, 20 built
Aerauto PL.5C 1949 1949 roadable aircraft, 1 built
Janowski Don Kichot/J-1 1970 1 seat homebuilt, unk no. built
Spencer Air Car 1970 4 seat homebuilt amphibian, 51 built
SZD-45 Ogar 1973 2 seat motorglider, 65 built
Neukom AN-20 1978 motorglider experimental 1 seat
Taylor Bird 1980 2 seat homebuilt, unk no. built
Strojnik S-2 1980 motorglider 1 seater, 8+ built.
Aérostructure Lutin 80 1983 1 seat ultralight motorglider, 2 built
Birdman Chinook 1982 ultralight homebuilt, 1100+ built
Alpha J-5 Marco 1983 1 seat ultralight motorglider, unk no. built
Quad City Challenger 1983 2 seat ultralight, 3,000+ built
Spectrum Beaver 1983 ultralight homebuilt, 2080+ built
Funk Fk6 1985 1 seat ultralight motorglider, unk no. built 
Advanced Aeromarine Buccaneer 1988 2 seat amphibious biplane, unk no. built
D-8 Moby Dick 1988 2 seater, 37 built
Seabird Seeker 1989 observation aircraft 2 seater, 31 built
Technoflug Piccolo 1989 1 seat ultralight motorglider, unk no. built
Rans s-12 Airaile 1990 2 seater, 1100+ built
Aeroprakt A-20 Vista 1991 2 seater 
Aviasud Engineering Albatros 1991 UL biplane 
Partenair Mystere 1996 2 seater, 3 built
AAC SeaStar 1998 2 seat amphibious biplane, 91 built
Alpaero Exel 1998 motoplaneur monoplane en kit, 9 ex.
Sea Storm Z2, 1998 hydravion biplane, 12 built
AAC SeaStar 2002 amphibious 2 seater, 91 built
Ekolot JK 01A Elf 2006 motorglider monoplane
Bagalini Bagaliante circa 2010 motorglider 1 seat
ICON Aircraft A5 2013 2 seat amphibious light sport, in production
Vickers Aircraft Wave 2 seat carbon fiber amphibious light sport aircraft, in final development

Propeller behind the tail
Pénaud Planophore 1871 first aerodynamically stable fixed-wing aeroplane, rubber powered model, 1 built
Convair 111 Air Car 1945 roadable airplane, 1 built
Prescott Pusher 1985 4 seat homebuilt, about 30 built
Air Quest Nova 21 1992 2 seat homebuilt, unk no. built
Eviation Alice 2019 transport electric plane prototype in development 10/11 seats

Lateral behind wing
Curtiss H-1 America 1914 transatlantic biplane, 2 built
Friedrichshafen G.I 1915 bomber, 1 built
LFG Roland G.I 1915 bomber, 1 built
Rumpler G.I, II and III 1915 bomber c.220 built 
Schutte-Lanz G.I 1915 bomber 1 built (behind wing)
Airco DH.3 1916 bomber, 2 built
Avro 523 Pike 1916 bomber, 2 built
Friedrichshafen G.II 1916 bomber, 35 built
Gotha G.II 1916 bomber, 11 built
Gotha G.III 1916 bomber, 25 built
Gotha G.IV 1916 bomber, 230 built
Royal Aircraft Factory F.E.4 1916 bomber, 2 built
Friedrichshafen G.III 1917 bomber, 338 built
Gotha G.V 1917 bomber, 205 built
Boeing GA-1 1920 bomber 10 built 
Udet U 11 Kondor 1926 airliner, 1 built

1930 and later
Praga E-210 and E-211 1936 transport, 2 built
Bell YFM-1 Airacuda 1937 interceptor, 13 built
Convair B-36 Peacemaker 1946 bomber, 384 built
Baumann Brigadier 1947 transport, 2 built
Nord 2100 Norazur 1947 transport, 1 built
Monsted-Vincent MV-1 Starflight 1948 airliner, 1 built
Piaggio P.136 1948 amphibious transport, 63 built
Dinfia IA 45 Querandi 1957 5/6 seater, 2 built
Piaggio P.166 1957 transport, 145 built
AAC Angel, 1984 transport, 4 built
Piaggio P.180 Avanti 1986 executive transport, 216+ built
Mc Donnel Douglas MD-80 1987 Liner experimental Propfan
EM-11 Orka 2003 4 seat transport, 5 built
Burevestnik-24 2004 ground-effect aircraft 24 seats, 6 built
OMA SUD Skycar 2007 transport, 1 built
Aeroprakt A-36 Vulcan 2011 2 seater

Lateral nacelles
Custer Channel Wing 1942 experimental aircraft, 4 built
Embraer/FMA CBA 123 Vector 1990 airliner, 2 built
NAL Saras 2004 airliner, 2 built

Remote drive

Propeller ahead of tail

Within airframe
Megone biplane 1913 2 seat, 1 built
Fischer Fibo-2a 1954 1 seat motorglider, 1 built
Rhein Flugzeugbau RW 3 Multoplan 1955 RFB Fantrainer prototype, 27 built
Kuffner WK-1 1970 motorglider 1 seat, 1 built
Rhein-Flugzeugbau Sirius II 1972 2 seat motorglider, unk no. built
Neukom AN-20C 1983 1 seat ultralight homebuilt motorglider, 1 built
PJ-II Dreamer 2016 jet fighter style 2 seater, 1 built

Behind wing
Burgess model I 1913 patrol floatplane, 1 built
Mann & Grimmer M.1 1915, 1 built
Carden-Baynes Bee 1937 2 seat tourer, 1 built 
Raab Krähe 1958 1 seat motorglider, 30 built
Eipper Quicksilver 1974 1 seat ultralight

Theseus Aircraft 1996 NASA research aircraft, no pilot, 1 built

Inside tail
Bede XBD-2/BD-3 1961 ducted fan boundary layer control aircraft, 1 built 
Mississippi State University XAZ-1 Marvelette 1962 experimental aircraft to test ideas XV-11 Marvel, 1 built 
Mississippi State University XV-11 Marvel 1965 boundary layer control test aircraft, 1 built

Behind tail
Antoinette I, 1906, 2 seats experimental, project 
Paulhan-Tatin Aéro-Torpille No.1 1911 monoplane, 1 built 
Kasyanenko No. 5 1917 experimental biplane, 1 built
Göppingen Gö 9 1941 experimental propulsion aircraft, 1 built
Dornier Do 212 1942 experimental amphibian, 1 built
Douglas XB-42 Mixmaster 1944, bomber, 2 built
Douglas DC-8 (piston airliner) 1945, transport project, not built
Lockheed Big Dipper 1945 transport, 1 built 
Douglas Cloudster II 1947 transport, 1 built
Waco Aristocraft 1947 transport, 1 built
Acme Sierra 1948 1 seat experimental, 1 built
 Allenbaugh Grey Ghost, 1948 1 seat experimental, 1 built 
 Parks Alumni Racer, 1949 1 seat experimental, 1 built 
Planet Satellite 1949 4 seat transport, 1 built
Taylor Aerocar 1949 2 seat roadable aircraft, 6 built
Pützer Bussard SR-57 1958 experimental 2 seater, 90 hp, 1 built 

1960 and later
HMPAC Puffin 1961 human powered aircraft, 2 built
Lesher Nomad 1961 experimental 2 seater homebuilt, one built
Aerocar Aero-Plane 1964 four seater 1 built
Lesher Teal 1965 experimental 1 seat homebuilt, one built
HPA Toucan 1972 human powered aircraft, 1 built
Ryson STP-1 Swallow 1972 2 seat homebuilt motorglider, 1 built
Bede BD-5 1973 1 seat homebuilt, about 150 built
Aerocar Mini-IMP 1974 1 seat homebuilt, 250+ built
AmEagle American Eaglet 1975 1 seat self-launching ultralight sailplane, 12 built
Landray GL.02 1978 tandem layout (Pou du Ciel) 1 seat, 1 built
Grinvalds Orion 1981 4 seat homebuilt, about 17 built
LearAvia Lear Fan 1981 transport, 3 built
Cirrus VK-30 1988 5 seat homebuilt, about 13 built
Miller JM-2 and Pushy Galore 1989 racer, 3 built
SolarFlight Sunseeker I 1990 solar aircraft 1 seater, 1 ex.
Grob GF 200 1991 transport, 1 built
Myasishchev Mayal 1992 multi-purpose amphibian, 1 built
NASA Perseus 1994 research aircraft, 1 built
Vmax Probe 1997 homebuilt racer, 1 built
Ameur Aviation Balbuzard/Baljims/Altania 1995 2 seater prototypes, 5 built
Bede BD-12 1998 2 seat homebuilt, 1 built
Aceair AERIKS 200 2002 2 seat kitplane, 1 built 
Chudzik CC-02 Rafale 2007 prototype three surface 2 seater tandem, 1ex.
LH Aviation LH-10 Ellipse 2007 2 seat homebuilt, 3 built

Propeller above fuselage or wing
Schleicher ASH 26 1995 1 seat glider with retractable propeller, 234 built
 Airfish-3 WIG 1990 Wing In Ground Effect demonstrator one seat, 1 built
 Airfish-8 WIG 2007 Wing In Ground Effect transport prototype 8/10 seats, 2 built

Canard and tandem layouts
A canard is an aircraft with a smaller wing ahead of the main wing. A tandem layout has both front and rear wings of similar dimensions.

Direct drive
Santos-Dumont 14-bis 1906 first public controlled sustained flight, 1 built
Fabre Hydravion 1910, first successful floatplane, 1 built
Paulhan biplane 1910, 3 built
Voisin Canard 1911 biplane, 10+ built
Gee Bee Model Q 1931 experimental, 1 built
Ambrosini SS.2 & 3 1935 experimental aircraft, 2 built
Ambrosini SS.4 1939 prototype fighter, 1 built
Curtiss-Wright XP-55 Ascender 1943 prototype fighter, 3 built
Miles M.35 Libellula 1942, experimental tandem wing carrier-based fighter, 1 built
Miles M.39B Libellula 1943, experimental (5/8 scale) tandem wing carrier-based bomber, 1 built 
Skoda-Kauba V7 1944 1 seat, project

1945 and later
In this section Rutan pushers are more than 1000 built.
Mikoyan-Gurevich MiG-8 Utka 1945 swept wing demonstrator prototype, 1 built
Lockspeiser LDA-01 1971 experimental scale development aircraft, 1 built
Rutan VariViggen 1972 homebuilt, about 20 built
Rutan VariEze 1975 2 seat homebuilt, about 400 built
Rutan Long-EZ 1979 2 seat homebuilt, about 800 built
Diehl Aeronautical XTC Hydrolight 1981 amphibian UL 1 seat
OMAC Laser 300 1981, transport, 3 built
Cozy III 1982 3 seater amateur built 
Avtek 400 1984 transport, 1 built
Cozy Mk IV 1988 four seater amateur built, ~ 350 built
Beechcraft Starship 1989 airliner, 53 built
Berkut 360 1988 2 seater tandem, 31 built
AASI Jetcruzer 1989 transport, 3 built
Velocity SE 1995 4 seater, ~ 268 built
Steve Wright Stagger-Ez 2003 modified Cozy homebuilt, 1 built
RMT Bateleur 115 T 2007 2 seater  
E-Go Aeroplanes e-Go 2013 ultralight and light-sport aircraft, 1 built
Cobalt Co50 Walkyrie 2015 prototype 4 seater, 1 built

Remote engine mounting
Langley Aerodrome Number 5 1896 experimental model
Wright Flyer 1903 experimental airplane, first recognized powered, sustained flight, 1 built 
Wright Model A 1906 biplane, about 60 built
 Deperdussin-de Feure model 2, 1910, experimental, 1 built 
De Bruyere C1 1917 fighter prototype 1 seater, 1 ex.
Kyūshū J7W, prototype fighter, 1 seat, 2130 hp, 1945, 2 built
AeroVironment Gossamer Condor 1977 human powered aircraft won Kremer prize, 1 built
AeroVironment Gossamer Albatross 1979 human powered aircraft, 2 built
Dickey E-Racer 1986 homebuilt, unk no. built
British Aerospace P.1233-1 Saba 1988 anti-helicopter and close air support attack aircraft, project

Joined wings
A tandem (or three-surface) configuration whose wingtips are joined is a Closed wing.

Ben Brown SC  1932, experimental joined wing, 1 built
Ligeti Stratos 1985 1 seat homebuilt, 2 built
Airkraft Sunny 1989 2 seater, 250 built

Tailless aircraft, Flying wings

Tailless aircraft
Tailless aircraft lack a horizontal stabilizer.

Dunne D.4 1908, 1 built
Dunne D.5 1910, 1 built
Dunne D.6 & D.7 1911 monoplane, 2 built
Dunne D.8 1912, 5 built
Westland-Hill Pterodactyl series 1928, several built
Lippisch Delta 1 1931, experimental tailless monoplane, 1 built
Waterman Whatsit 1932 roadable aircraft, 1 built
Waterman Arrowplane 1935 roadable aircraft, 1 built
Waterman Arrowbile 1937 roadable aircraft, 5 built
Kayaba Ku-4 1941 (not flown) research aircraft, 1 built
Handley Page Manx 1943 experimental tailless aircraft, 1 built
Northrop XP-56 Black Bullet 1943 tailless fighter, 2 built
Sud-Est SE-2100, prototype tourer, 2 seats, 140 hp, 1945 
M.L. Aviation Utility 1953 inflatable wing, 4 built
DINFIA IA 38 1960 transport, 1 built
Fauvel AV.45 1960 1 seat motor glider, unk no. built
Rohr 2-175 1974 2 seat roadable aircraft, 1 built
Cascade Kasperwing I-80 1976 UL 1 seater
Pterodactyl Ascender 1979 1 seat ultralight, 1396 built
Mitchell U2 Superwing 1980 1 seat ultralight
 Facet Opal, 1988, 1 seat, experimental flying wing, 1 built 
Wingco Atlantica 2002 Blended wing-body demonstrator 5 seats, 1 built 
Aériane Swift Light PAS 2007 monoplane
Horten Aircraft HX-2 2019 2 seat prototype

Tailless, fabric wing, no fuselage
Ultralight trike or Flexwing
Paramotor or Powered paraglider
Powered parachute

Flying wings
Flying wings lack a distinct fuselage, with crew, engines, and payload contained within the wing structure.
Horten V 1938 powered testbed, 3 built
Northrop N-1M 1940 experimental flying wing, 1 built
Northrop N-9M 1942 experimental flying wing, 4 built
Horten H.VII 1944 2 seat prototype
Northrop B-35 1946 bomber, 4 built
Davis Flying Wing 1987 
Horten PUL-10 1992 2 seater

Push-pull aircraft

Sides of fuselage
Zeppelin-Staaken R.V 1917 bomber, 3 built
Bristol Braemar 1918 bomber, 2 built
Handley Page V/1500 1918 bomber, 63 built
Farman F.121 Jabiru 1923 airliner, 9 built
Dornier Do K 1929 airliner, 3 built
Fokker F.32 1929 airliner, 7 built
Farman F.220 1932 airliner and bomber, about 80 built

Above fuselage
Felixstowe Porte Baby 1915 patrol flying boat, 11 built
Curtiss NC 1918 patrol flying boat, 10 built
Johns Multiplane 1919 bomber, 1 built
Bristol Pullman 1920 airliner, 1 built
Naval Aircraft Factory TF 1920 fighter flying boat, 4 built
SIAI S.22 1921 racing flying boat, 1 built
Dornier Wal 1922 flying boat, about 300 built
CAMS 33 1923 patrol flying boat, 21 built
Macchi M.24 1924 flying boat, unk. no built
Savoia-Marchetti S.55 1924 flying boat, 243+ built
Boeing XPB 1925 patrol flying boat, 1 built
Caproni Ca.73 1925 bomber unk. no. built
NVI F.K.33 1925 airliner, 1 built
CAMS 51 1926 flying boat, 3 built
Dornier Do R Superwal 1926 airliner flying boat, 19 built
Kawasaki Ka 87 1926 bomber, 28 built
Latécoère 21 1926 airliner flying boat, 7 built
Latécoère 23 1927 transport flying boat, 1 built
Latécoère 24 1927 mailplane flying boat, 1 built
Farman F.180 1927 airliner, 3 built
Savoia-Marchetti S.63 1927 flying boat, 1 built
CAMS 53 1928 transport flying boat, 30 built
CAMS 55 1928 patrol flying boat, 112 built
Latécoère 32 1928 mailplane flying boat, 8 built
Latham 47 1928 patrol flying boat, 16 built
Dornier X 1929 airliner flying boat, 3 built
Comte AC-3 1930 bomber, 1 built
Dornier Do P 1930 bomber, 1 built
Dornier Do S 1930 flying boat, 1 built
Hinkler Ibis 1930 2 seat monoplane, 1 built
Latécoère 340 1930 airliner flying boat, 1 built
Latécoère 380 1930 flying boat, 5 built
Blériot 125 1931 airliner, 1 built
Bratu 220 1932 airliner, 1 built
Latécoère 500 1932 transport flying boat, 2 built 
Caproni Ca.90 1929 bomber, 1 built
Sikorsky XP2S 1932 patrol flying boat, 1 built
CAMS 58 1933 airliner flying boat, 4 built
Lioré et Olivier LeO H-27 1933 mailplane flying boat 1 built
Loire 70 1933 patrol flying boat, 8 built
Tupolev ANT-16 1933 bomber 1 built
Tupolev ANT-20 1934 transport, 2 built
Tupolev MTB-1 1934 patrol flying boat, 25 built
Dornier Do 18 1935 patrol flying boat, 170 built
Bartini DAR 1936 patrol flying boat, 1 built
Chyetverikov ARK-3 1936 flying boat, 7 built
Dornier Do 26 1939 push-pull flying boat, 6 built
Dornier Seastar 1984 push-pull amphibious 12 seats, 2 built

Extremities
Caproni Ca.60 1921 airliner flying boat, 1 built
Dornier Do 335 1943 push-pull fighter, 38 built
Moynet Jupiter 1963 push-pull transport, 2 built
Aero Design DG-1 1977 push-pull racer, 1 built
Rutan Defiant 1978 transport, 19+ built
Rutan Voyager 1984 endurance record aircraft, 1 built*
Star Kraft SK-700 1994 push-pull transport,
Aeronix Airelle 2002 tandem wing 2 seater, 5 built

On nose and between booms
Siemens-Schuckert DDr.I 1917 fighter, 1 built
Thomas-Morse MB-4 1920 mailplane, 2+ built
Bellanca TES 1929, distance record aircraft, 1 built
Savoia-Marchetti S.65 1929 racing floatplane 1 built
Tupolev I-12 1931 Fighter prototype
Fokker D.XXIII 1939 fighter, 1 built
Moskalyev SAM-13 1940 (unflown) push-pull fighter, 0 built 
Marton X/V (RMI-8) 1944 (unflown) fighter, 1 destroyed before completion
Cessna Skymaster 1963 push-pull transport, 2993 built
Canaero Toucan 1986 ultralight, 16+ built
Schweizer RU-38 Twin Condor 1995 push-pull reconnaissance aircraft, 5 built
Adam A500 2002 push-pull transport, 7 built

On wings and between booms
Caproni Ca.1 1914 bomber, 162 built
Caproni Ca.2 1915 bomber, 9 built
AD Seaplane Type 1000 1916 bomber, 1 built
Anatra DE 1916 bomber, 1 built
Caproni Ca.3 1916 bomber, about 300 built
Caproni Ca.4 1917 triplane bomber, 44-53 built
Caproni Ca.5 1917 bomber, 662 built
Gotha G.VI 1918 bomber, 2 built
Grahame-White Ganymede 1919 bomber/airliner, 1 built

Rotorcraft 
Bensen autogyros 1953
Fairey Jet Gyrodyne 1954, experimental gyrodyne
McDonnell XV-1 1954, experimental compound helicopter, 550 hp
Avian Gyroplane 1960, 2 seats, about 6 built 
Wallis autogyros 1961
CarterCopter / Carter PAV 1998
Sikorsky X2 2008, experimental compound helicopter
Sikorsky S-97 Raider 2015, experimental compound helicopter

See also
List of pusher aircraft by configuration - in alphabetical order
Pusher configuration
Push-pull configuration
Tractor configuration

Bibliography
 Extension-Shaft Pusher Type Aircraft, Sport aviation

References

Notes

Citations

Bibliography

Aircraft configurations